Yuriria is a genus of cyprinid fish endemic to the Lerma–Chapala–Grande de Santiago and Ameca basins in Mexico.  There are three described species in this genus.

Species
 Yuriria alta (D. S. Jordan, 1880) (Jalisco chub)
 Yuriria amatlana Domínguez-Domínguez, Pompa-Domínguez & Doadrio, 2007
 Yuriria chapalae (D. S. Jordan & Snyder, 1899) (Chapala chub)

References
 

Cyprinid fish of North America
Endemic fish of Mexico
Cyprinidae genera
 
Taxa named by David Starr Jordan